Chaoborus astictopus, the Clear Lake gnat, is a species of phantom midges in the family Chaoboridae. The older larvae is commonly found in the profundal zone of lakes during the day and in the open waters at night, suggesting that they are negatively phototactic.

The larvae can be vulnerable to the pathogen Thelohania corethrae during the winter season. They are also susceptible to the fungal pathogen Tolypocladium cylindrosporum.

References

Chaoboridae
Articles created by Qbugbot
Insects described in 1924